The 2015 Nigerian Senate election in Anambra State was held on March 28, 2015, to elect members of the Nigerian Senate to represent Anambra State. Stella Oduah representing Anambra North, Emmanuel Uba representing Anambra South both won on the platform of the People's Democratic Party. While Victor Umeh representing Anambra Central won on the platform of the All Progressives Grand Alliance.

Overview

Summary

Results

Anambra Central 
The three major parties All Progressives Congress, All Progressives Grand Alliance and People's Democratic Party registered with the Independent National Electoral Commission to contest in the election. APGA Victor Umeh won the election, defeating PDP candidate Uche Ekwunife, APC candidate Chris Ngige and other party candidates.

Anambra South 
The three major parties All Progressives Congress, All Progressives Grand Alliance and People's Democratic Party registered with the Independent National Electoral Commission to contest in the election. PDP candidate Emmanuel Uba won the election, defeating  APGA candidate Earnest Ndukwe, APC candidate Ethel Obiakor and other party candidates.

Anambra North 
The three major parties All Progressives Congress, All Progressives Grand Alliance and People's Democratic Party registered with the Independent National Electoral Commission to contest in the election. PDP candidate Stella Oduah won the election, defeating  APGA candidate Chukwu-Dubem Obaze, APC can

didate Ralph Okereke and other party candidates.

References 

March 2015 events in Nigeria